Sigfrido is a male given name, derived from the German given name Siegfried.

Notable people with this name include:
 
 Sigfrido Burmann, Spanish art director
 Sigfrido Cuen Rodelo, Mexican businessman
 Sigfrido Ranucci, Italian journalist
 Sigfrido Reyes Morales, Salvadoran politician
 Sigfrido Tiñga, Filipino politician
 Sigfrido Vogel, Argentine sports shooter

See also
 Sigfrido (film) or The Dragon's Blood, an Italian epic adventure film

References

Masculine given names